Fernando Pacheco, M.D. (December 8, 1927 – November 16, 2017) was the personal physician and cornerman for world heavyweight boxing champion Muhammad Ali as well as numerous other boxing champions. 

Known in popular culture as The Fight Doctor, Pacheco left Ali's team in the fall of 1977 after Ali didn't perform as expected in a battery of physical reflex tests, leading Ali to reject Pacheco's medical advice to retire. 

For the next two decades, Pacheco was a noted boxing analyst for several television networks, including NBC and Showtime. He also became an author and self-taught painter, with most of his works focused on his career in boxing and his youth in the Ybor City neighborhood of Tampa, Florida.

Early life
Fernando Pacheco Jimenez was born in the Cuban-American immigrant community of Ybor City in Tampa, Florida, to Jose (J.D.) Pacheco, a pharmacist, and Consuelo Jimenez, both of Spaniard-Cuban descent. Raised bilingual, Pacheco worked in his father’s drugstore, which sparked his interest in medicine. As a teenager, Pacheco was also a waiter at the Columbia Restaurant.

Though not a boxer himself, Pacheco took an early interest in boxing. At the time, the Ybor City community was known as a boxing hotbed, with amateur matches regularly held at the Circulo Cubano de Tampa and other clubs and venues around the neighborhood, and Pacheco attended many bouts. Pacheco also developed an early interest in art, which was inspired by a trip to the Ringling Museum of Art in Sarasota with his maternal grandfather, Gustavo Jimenez.

Pacheco graduated from Tampa Jefferson High School, earned a bachelor's degree from the University of Florida and completed his medical degree from the Leonard M. Miller School of Medicine at the University of Miami.

Career
As a young physician, Pacheco set up a medical practice in the Overtown community of Miami. In the late 1950s, he regularly attended boxing cards arranged by local promoter Chris Dundee. One night after a fight card, Pacheco was introduced to Angelo Dundee, the promoter's brother, a boxing trainer who ran the 5th Street Gym.  Angelo Dundee offered the doctor free tickets to matches if he would "help stitch up my fighters", beginning an iconic partnership that would last many years.

Muhammad Ali 
Pacheco met Muhammad Ali in 1960, when he came to the 5th Street Gym in Miami, Florida to train with Angelo Dundee. Pacheco became Ali's cornerman and fight physician from 1962–1977. Pacheco described Ali as anatomically the most physically-perfect human being he had ever seen. When Ali joined the Nation of Islam and changed his name from Cassius Clay in 1964, members of the Nation reportedly wanted him to replace Pacheco, Dundee, and the rest of his support staff. Ali refused, preferring to continue working with the team of people who had helped him become heavyweight champion.

By the mid-1970s, Pacheco observed that Ali's reflexes had slowed, and expressed medical concern that the now veteran boxer had sustained some brain and kidney damage due to years of punishment in the ring. 

Following an Ali victory against the hard-hitting Earnie Shavers in September 1977, Pacheco performed a post-fight battery of reflex tests on Ali. After Ali didn't perform at a level that would be requisite for being able to protect himself in the ring, an alarmed Pacheco recommended that Ali retire immediately from boxing. When Ali refused, Pacheco decided that from a medical perspective, he couldn't ethically continue as Ali's primary physician and left the fighter's camp. 

Pacheco later explained that "The New York State Athletic Commission gave me a report that showed Ali's kidneys were falling apart. I wrote to Angelo Dundee, Ali's trainer, his wife and Ali himself. I got nothing back in response. That's when I decided enough is enough." Ali fought four more matches (losing three) after Pacheco left his team before finally retiring in late 1981.

Despite their disagreement, Pacheco and Ali remained friends. The two were reunited in person for a final time in 2002, when Ali, who was by then suffering the acute effects of Parkinson's syndrome, told his former physician, "You was right."

Later life
Pacheco moved on to become a television boxing analyst, working for NBC and Univision. As a first generation Cuban-American, Pacheco spoke Spanish fluently, and conducted interviews as well as translated corners between rounds in real time for English speaking networks when bouts featured Spanish speaking fighters and cornermen, which endeared him to both Latino fighters and their fans. Julio Cesar Chavez in particular believed that Pacheco was one of only a few in the American media that interviewed Latino fighters fairly due to his ability to ask fighters such as Chavez questions in Spanish without losing the meaning of anything said in translation. Pacheco also provided color commentary in Spanish for fight broadcasts, and other sports-related packages televised on Univision. 

Pacheco would become Showtime's featured boxing analyst in the early 1980s and continued his association with the network until his retirement from TV in the late 1990s, covering many notable fights along the way. 

Pacheco was the author of several books, plays, screenplays, and short stories. Many of them are set in the Ybor City neighborhood where he grew up. Pacheco’s works included a memoir (Ybor City Chronicles), an autobiography (Blood in My Coffee) and a cookbook (The Columbia Restaurant Spanish Cookbook, co-authored with longtime friend Adela Gonzmart).

Pacheco was also an award-winning self-taught artist, primarily inspired by Norman Rockwell with influences of Diego Rivera's use of bold colors. As with his writing, the subjects of many of his paintings are boxing and his youth in Ybor City.

Pacheco was portrayed by Paul Rodriguez in the cinema film Ali (2001). A biographical film, Ferdie Pacheco: The World of the Fight Doctor, was released in 2004.

Death
Pacheco died in his sleep on 16 November 2017 at his home in Miami, Florida at the age of 89.

Personal life
Pacheco resided in Miami with his wife, Luisita, and had three daughters and one son with Elva Anne Sweeney: Dawn Marie, Evelyn, and Ferdie James. He had daughter Tina Louise with present wife, Luisita.

References

External links
Ferdie Pacheco Papers at the University of South Florida

1927 births
2017 deaths
American boxing trainers
American sportspeople of Cuban descent
Boxing commentators
People from Tampa, Florida
Thomas Jefferson High School (Tampa, Florida) alumni
University of Florida alumni
Leonard M. Miller School of Medicine alumni
American sports physicians